Series 24 of University Challenge ran between 21 September 1994 and 29 March 1995. This was the first series of the show for eight years and aired on BBC Two for the first time, having previously been broadcast on ITV. Jeremy Paxman took over as presenter from Bamber Gascoigne, who had presented the show from its inception in 1962 through until 1987.

The series was won by Trinity College, Cambridge, who defeated New College, Oxford 390–180 in the final. The members of the winning team – Sean Blanchflower, Kwasi Kwarteng, Robin Bhattacharyya, and Erik Gray – were presented with the trophy by Gascoigne.

Results
 Winning teams are highlighted in bold.
 Teams with green scores (winners) returned in the next round, while those with red scores (losers) were eliminated.
 Teams with orange scores have lost, but survived as highest scoring losers.
 A score in italics indicates a match decided on a tie-breaker question.

First round

Second round

Quarter-finals

Semi-finals

Final

 The trophy and title were awarded to the Trinity team comprising Sean Blanchflower, Kwasi Kwarteng, Robin Bhattacharyya, and Erik Gray.
 The trophy was presented by Bamber Gascoigne.

References

External links
 University Challenge Homepage
 Blanchflower Results Table

1994
1994 British television seasons
1995 British television seasons
Television game shows with incorrect disambiguation